142 may refer to:

 142 (number), an integer
 AD 142, a year of the Julian calendar
 142 BC, a year of the pre-Julian Roman calendar